Uqqummiut (Inuinnaqtun: Uqqurmiut) is a territorial electoral district (riding) for the Legislative Assembly of Nunavut, Canada.

The riding consists of the communities of Clyde River and Qikiqtarjuaq.

The Member of the Legislative Assembly was Samuel Nuqingaq. On 24 October 2014, he was expelled for the legislature and the seat became vacant with a by-election to be held within six months. The by-election was held 9 February 2015 and Pauloosie Keyootak of Qikiqtarjuaq was elected.

Election results

1999 election

2004 election

2008 election

2013 election
After the original count both Samuel Nuqingaq and Niore Iqalukjuak were tied with 187 votes each. A recount was held November 5 and Nuqingaq was declared elected with 187 while Iqalukjuak had 185.

2015 By-election

2017 election

References

External links
Website of the Legislative Assembly of Nunavut

Electoral districts of Qikiqtaaluk Region
1999 establishments in Nunavut